The canyon spotted whiptail (Aspidoscelis burti) is a species of lizard in the family Teiidae. The species is native to northwestern Mexico and the adjacent southwestern United States.

Etymology
The specific name, burti, is in honor of American herpetologist Charles Earle Burt.

Geographic range
A. burti is found in the Mexican state of Sonora and in the U.S. state of Arizona.

Habitat
The preferred natural habitats of A. burti are forest, shrubland, and rocky areas.

Reproduction
A. burti is oviparous.

References

Further reading
Reeder TW, Cole CJ, Dessauer HC (2002). "Phylogenetic Relationships of Whiptail Lizards of the Genus Cnemidophorus (Squamata: Teiidae): A Test of Monphyly, Reevaluation of Karyotypic Evolution, and Review of Hybrid Origins". American Museum Novitates (3365): 1–61. (Aspidoscelis burti, new combination, p. 22).
Smith HM, Brodie ED Jr (1982). Reptiles of North America: A Guide to Field Identification. New York: Golden Press. 240 pp.  (hardcover),  (paperback). (Cnemidophorus burti, p. 96).
Stebbins RC (2003). A Field Guide to Western Reptiles and Amphibians, Third Edition. The Peterson Field Guide Series ®. Boston and New York: Houghton Mifflin Company. xiii + 533 pp. . (Cnemidophorus burti, pp. 318–319).
Taylor EH (1938). "Notes on the Herpetological Fauna of the Mexican State of Sonora". University of Kansas Science Bulletin 24 (19): 475–503 + Plate XLIII. (Cnemidophorus burti, new species, pp. 485–487 + Plate XLIII, figure 2).

Aspidoscelis
Reptiles described in 1938
Taxa named by Edward Harrison Taylor
Fauna of the Southwestern United States
Reptiles of the United States
Reptiles of Mexico